= The Hibbs Lupus Trust =

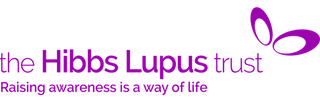
- Founded: 11 October 2011
- Founders: John Hibbs, Viki Hibbs
- Type: Charitable organisation
- Registration no.: England and Wales: 1147783
- Purpose: Lupus Awareness, Patient Support
- Location: Hednesford, Staffordshire
- Region served: United Kingdom
- Services: Helpline, Online forum, Face-to-face support sessions
- Key people: John Hibbs (Founder & Chairman), Viki Hibbs (Founder & Trustee)
- Website: www.hibbslupustrust.org

The Hibbs Lupus Trust is a lupus awareness and patient support charity in the United Kingdom, formed on 11 October 2011 by the Hibbs Family and is run entirely by volunteers. The Hibbs Lupus Trust gained full charity status with the Charity Commission in June 2012. It is also a member of The Fundraising Standards Board.

The Hibbs Lupus Trust's work is entirely funded by the public. It raises money through donations, legacies, community fundraising, events, retail and corporate partnerships. There is no membership to The Hibbs Lupus Trust, all of its services and support are provided for free.

It also provides information about lupus and runs campaigns aimed at raising awareness of the disease and influencing public policy.

== History ==
The Hibbs Lupus Trust was founded in 2011 by John Hibbs, whose sister Viki was diagnosed with lupus in 2008. In 2014 The Hibbs Lupus Trust set up the UK's first annual lupus walk to celebrate World Lupus Day. In August 2015 The Hibbs Lupus Trust changed its 'colour' to purple in a bid to unite lupus organisations around the world and raise greater awareness.

== Mission ==
The Hibbs Lupus Trust mission is to:

- Provide support and information to anybody affected by or concerned about lupus.
- Raise awareness of the symptoms of lupus to encourage early diagnosis and reduce life-threatening complications associated with the condition.
- Raise funds to provide facilities, equipment and services for NHS hospitals and Foundation Trusts for the benefit of lupus patients.

== Services ==
The Hibbs Lupus Trust provides a range of services to support those affected by lupus, their friends and family. A selection of these services include a telephone support helpline, online forum and face-to-face support meetings.

== Fundraising ==
The Hibbs Lupus Trust host a series of annual fundraising events, which include running, golf and cycling events. The most notable event is annual World Lupus Day Walk.
